Jungle Man may refer to:

Jungle Man (film), a 1941 film directed by Harry L. Fraser
"Jungle Man" (song), a song by the Red Hot Chili Peppers
Jungle Man (song), a song by The Meters, on their 1974 album, Rejuvenation
Daniel Cates, a professional poker player nicknamed "jungleman12" or simply "Jungleman"